The BRM P25 was a Formula One racing car raced from 1956 to 1960 and the second car produced by the British Racing Motors consortium. After the failure of the complex BRM V16, the P25's design emphasized simplicity. The car was fitted with a 2.5-litre straight-4 engine, producing some 275 horsepower. The P25 would be the foundation of BRM's successes in the late 1950s and early 1960s.

Development
With BRM in financial trouble after the V16 experiment, Alfred Owen purchased the team and set work on a new car. While the car was being developed, BRM ran a privateer Maserati 250F through the 1954 and 1955 seasons. Stewart Tresilian and Tony Rudd designed an entirely new twin-cam 2.5-litre four-cylinder for the P25. The engine's large bore allowed for larger valves to be fitted. In an exception to keeping with BRM's all-British supply policy, two Weber carburetors were fitted. The engine was mounted to a simple ladder frame steel chassis, with a centre tub monocoque section.  The P25 used Lockheed disc brakes at the front wheels, which would later be replaced by Dunlop discs. Uniquely, a single brake disc was fitted to the gearbox at the rear.

Racing record
The P25 began racing in non-championship events in September 1955. The car's horsepower proved to be its strong suit, but its handling and reliability problems were quickly revealed. Three Type 25s were entered for Tony Brooks, Mike Hawthorn, and Ron Flockhart in the model's world championship debut, the 1956 British Grand Prix. However, none finished. Reliability woes would plague the team during the P25's early development. The large valves were prone to letting debris into the engine, and the single rear disc often failed. A P25 would not finish a Grand Prix until Harry Schell's fifth place in the 1958 Monaco Grand Prix. Schell and Jean Behra would finish 2nd and 3rd in that year's Dutch Grand Prix. They were the first podiums for BRM. Four more points finishes from Behra, Schell, and new-hire Joakim Bonnier placed BRM 4th in the inaugural Constructor's Championship. Bonnier took his and BRM's first victory at the 1959 Dutch Grand Prix. With the P25 running reliably, BRM was able to secure 3rd in the Constructor's Championship. Just as the P25 became reliable, Cooper started the rear-engine revolution and quickly rendered front engined cars such as the P25 obsolete. BRM began work on a rear engined model, the P48 not long after Bonnier's victory. The P48 would replace the P25 midway through the 1960 season.

In addition to the factory entries, the British Racing Partnership ran a P25 for Stirling Moss and Hans Herrmann in 1959. Moss scored a 2nd place in the British Grand Prix before the car was destroyed in a massive accident during the German Grand Prix with Hermann at the wheel.

Complete Formula One World Championship results

* The World Constructors' Championship was not awarded before 1958.
** All points scored using the BRM P48

References

BRM Formula One cars